Thiazyl fluoride, NSF, is a colourless, pungent gas at room temperature and condenses to a pale yellow liquid at 0.4 °C.  Along with thiazyl trifluoride, NSF3, it is an important precursor to sulfur-nitrogen-fluorine compounds. It is notable for its extreme hygroscopicity.

Synthesis 
Thiazyl fluoride can be synthesized by various methods, such as fluorination of tetrasulfur tetranitride, with silver(II) fluoride or mercuric fluoride in tetrachloromethane, and purified by vacuum distillation. However, because this synthetic pathway yields numerous side-products, an alternative approach is the reaction of imino(triphenyl)phosphines with sulfur tetrafluoride by cleavage of the  bond to form sulfur difluoride imides and triphenyldifluorophosphorane. These products readily decompose yielding thiazyl fluoride.

For synthesis on a preparative scale, the decomposition of compounds already containing the  moiety is commonly used:

Reactivity 
Thiazyl fluoride reacts violently with water, decomposes at room temperature, and should be stored at −78 °C.

Reactions with Electrophiles 
The site of electrophilic attack is primarily dependent upon the strength of the electrophile. For example, hard Lewis acids attack at the site of fluorine to afford thiazyl salts:

Reacting strong Lewis acids, such as AsF5 and SbF5, can cleave NSF to yield the thiazyl cation and a fluoride ion.
By contrast, transition metal cations (which are classified as medium-hard acids) attack at the nitrogen atom due in part to Coulombic interactions. Soft acids with low valencies may attack at the sulfur atom. In the scheme below, electrophilic attack by a transition metal cation to NSF readily releases sulfur dioxide due to weak σ bonding and minimal π-back bonding at the sulfur atom.

Thiazyl fluoride may be stabilized as a complexing ligand to cationic carbonyl-metal compounds, such as [Re(CO)_5NSF]^{+}.

Reactions with Nucleophiles 
Nucleophilic attack on thiazyl fluoride occurs at the sulfur atom, whereby either the coordination number of sulfur is increased, or a fluorine atom is substituted.

Nucleophilic Substitution 
The triple bond in NSF is retained during nucleophilic substitution, and contributes to trimerization at room temperature.

The N≡SON(CF3)2 compound can be stabilized by incorporation of a carbonyl-metal complex.

Nucleophilic Addition 
Nucleophilic attack occurs at the site of the sulfur atom, thereby increasing its coordination number. Reacting cesium fluoride and NSF affords the salt given below.

The halogen derivatives XNSF2 (X = F, Cl, Br, I) can be synthesized from reacting Hg(NSF)2 with X2; whereby, ClNSF2 is the most stable compound observed in this series.

Oligimerization and Cycloaddition 
The length of the N-S  bond (1.448 Å) is short, indicating multiple bonding, and can be represented by the following resonance structures:

At room temperature, thiazyl fluoride undergoes cyclic trimerization via the N-S multiple bonding:

1,3,5-trifluoro-1,3,5,2,4,6-trithiatriazine is the yielded cyclic trimer, where each sulfur atom remains tetravalent.

Thiazyl fluoride also reacts via exothermic cycloaddition in the presence of dienes.

Properties

Structure and Bonding 
The NSF molecule has 18 total valence electrons and is isoelectronic to sulfur dioxide, SO_2. Thiazyl fluoride adopts Cs-symmetry and has been shown by isotopic substitution to be bent in the ground state. A combination of rotational analysis with Franck-Condon calculations has been applied to study the electronic excitation from the A''A' states, which results in the elongation of the N-S bond by 0.11 Å and a decrease in the NSF by 15.3.

In X-ray structural analysis of the cations [M(NSF)_6]^{2+}(M=Co, Ni), each NSF molecule is bound to the metal center through nitrogen. The observed bond lengths from Co-N to Ni-N are shortened which is related to the contraction of ionic radii as you move across the period.

References 

Fluorides
Nonmetal halides
Nitrides
Thiohalides
Sulfur–nitrogen compounds